Ochthebiinae is a subfamily of minute moss beetles in the family Hydraenidae. There are about 14 genera and more than 650 described species in Ochthebiinae.

Genera
These 14 genera belong to the subfamily Ochthebiinae:

 Aulacochthebius Kuwert, 1887
 Edaphobates Jäch & Díaz, 2003
 Ginkgoscia Jäch & Díaz, 2004
 Gymnanthelius Perkins, 1997
 Gymnochthebius Orchymont, 1943
 Hughleechia Perkins, 1981
 Meropathus Enderlein, 1901
 Micragasma Sahlberg, 1900
 Neochthebius Orchymont, 1932
 Ochthebius Leach, 1815
 Ochtheosus Perkins, 1997
 Protochthebius Perkins, 1997
 Tympallopatrum Perkins, 1997
 † Tympanogaster Janssens, 1967

References

Further reading

External links

 

Staphylinoidea
Articles created by Qbugbot